Dypsis rivularis is a species of flowering plant in the Arecaceae family. It is palm endemic to Madagascar, where it grows in forests near rivers. It is threatened by habitat loss. There are fewer than 100 mature individuals estimated to remain.

References

rivularis
Endemic flora of Madagascar
Endangered plants
Taxonomy articles created by Polbot
Taxa named by Henri Lucien Jumelle
Taxa named by Joseph Marie Henry Alfred Perrier de la Bâthie
Flora of the Madagascar dry deciduous forests